The Rust-Oleum Championship was a golf tournament on the Web.com Tour from 2014 to 2018. It was first played in June 2014 as the Cleveland Open at the Lakewood Country Club in Westlake, Ohio, a suburb of Cleveland. In 2016, it moved to Ivanhoe Club in Ivanhoe, Illinois.

In the inaugural edition, Steven Alker defeated Dawie van der Walt in an eleven-hole playoff, the longest in Web.com Tour history.

Winners

Bolded golfers graduated to the PGA Tour via the Web.com Tour regular-season money list.

See also
DAP Championship, a Web.com Tour Finals event in the Cleveland suburb of Beachwood to begin in 2016
Legend Financial Group Classic, a Web.com Tour event in the Cleveland suburb of Highland Heights from 2005 to 2007
Greater Cleveland Open, a Web.com Tour event from 1990 to 2001
Cleveland Open, a PGA Tour event from 1963 to 1972

References

External links
Coverage on the Web.com Tour's official site

Former Korn Ferry Tour events
Golf in Ohio
Golf in Illinois
Sports competitions in Cleveland
Recurring sporting events established in 2014
Recurring sporting events disestablished in 2018
2014 establishments in Ohio
2018 establishments in Ohio